The 8th Asian Swimming Championships were held November 25–28, 2009 in Foshan, China. It featured 38 different events (19 male, 19 female), all of which were contested in a 50m (long course) pool.

Participating countries
174 swimmers (102 males, 72 females) from 15 countries swam at the Championships. Teams were from:

 (2) (2 males) 
 (46) (21 m, 25 f) 
 (15) (8 m, 7 f) 
 (33) (16 m, 17 f) 
 (8) (8 males) 
 (28) (14 m, 14 f) 
 (4) (3 m, 1 f) 
 (3) (3 males) 
 (2) (2 males) 
 (8) (5 m, 3 f) 
 (3) (3 males) 
 (2) (2 males) 
 (4) (4 males) 
 (4) (3 m, 1 f) 
 (12) (8 m, 4 f)

Event schedule

Prelims (morning) sessions began at 9:00 a.m., Finals (evening) sessions began at 7:30 p.m.

Swimming Results

Men

Women

Swimming Medal Table

Synchronised Swimming

Results

Synchronised Swimming Medal Table

References

Synchronised Swimming Results

Asian Swimming Championships, 2009